Andrew Bowser is an American actor, writer and director best known for his fictional character 'Onyx the Fortuitous'.

Collaborating with Joseph M. Petrick, Bowser co-directed and starred in the independent comedy The Mother of Invention. Bowser also wrote, directed and starred in Jimmy Tupper Vs. The Goatman of Bowie which premiered at the 2010 South By Southwest Film Festival.

Early life 
As a child he worked as an actor in theater, television and film. He portrayed the role of the sickly child, Colin in the international tour of The Secret Garden, the role of young Henry in Henry Hill and guest starred in an episode of Homicide: Life on the Street opposite Elijah Wood.

While attending The School of Visual Arts, where he majored in film, he met Joseph M. Petrick and the two began collaborating on short films. In 2001, the two created a short film called Notes From The Rogues Gallery that would be the precursor to the film they would make in 2006. Bowser & Petrick also co-directed the music video of Eponine for the band Ozma in 2002 which was selected by Kung-Fu Records through a running online contest.

Career
Bowser left The School of Visual Arts after his second year and began working professionally in music videos. His first was the video of Mixtape for Butch Walker who hired Bowser after Bowser sent his reel along with a fan letter. This led to making music videos for, among others, Armor for Sleep, The Honorary Title, SR-71, Speech, Gym Class Heroes and his own band Zella Mayzell after releasing The Murder, Porn and Fatherhood EP. Zella Mayzell went on to be voted by Alternative Press as one of the top ten unsigned bands in the US.

In 2004, Petrick joined Bowser in Maryland, living as roommates. Between 2004 and 2006, they co-directed the short film A Winter Observed (written by Petrick) which premiered at the Annapolis Film Festival, as well as the music video of New Friend Request for Gym Class Heroes. Bowser also directed videos for The Hush Sound, Copeland and Forgive Durden.

In the spring of 2006, Petrick wrote the feature-length screenplay for the film Notes From the Rogues Gallery. Petrick & Bowser began searching for financing for the film, but after being unable to secure funding the pair decided to make a truncated version of the film with $20,000 they borrowed mostly on credit cards. The 50 minute version of the film screened at The Landlocked Film Festival in Petrick's home town. The following year, Zella Mayzell went on an indefinite hiatus as Bowser moved to Los Angeles with Petrick. Bowser directed more music videos for The Color Fred, Maylene and the Sons of Disaster, The Audition, The Hush Sound and Amber Pacific.

In 2008, Petrick wrote the screenplay for the feature film The Mother of Invention which Bowser starred in and co-directed with Petrick. The "mockumentary" style film followed aspiring inventor Vincent Dooly as he attempts to win a coveted young inventors award. The film starred Bowser, Jimmi Simpson, Kevin Corrigan, Mark Boone Junior, Dee Wallace, Craig Anton, Ruby Wendell, F. Jason Whitaker and Chris Hardwick. It featured cameos by Dave Allen, Chris Franjola, Keir O'Donnell, Martha Madison and Ron Lynch. The film screened at The Hollywood Film Festival and The Sci-Fi-London Film Festival. Later that year Bowser  directed music videos for The Grey Man and Not So Tough Found Out for the Copeland album You Are My Sunshine which was released as a bonus feature on the deluxe version of the record.

In 2009, MTV hired Bowser & Petrick to create a pilot for a half-hour sketch comedy show. They created The Underground which starred Bowser as a man who lived in the basement of the network and hacked into their broadcast feed to air sketches and interstitials that featured him and his puppet co-horts. It was not picked up by the network but contained sketches that were featured on CollegeHumor and won FunnyOrDie & HBO's Let's Go Viral contest, which led to creating the exclusive sketch Cycop for FunnyOrDie which premiered on July 12, 2010 and featured the protagonist from The Mother of Invention in a poorly made film of his creation. The sketch starred Bowser, Juno Temple, Ryan Cartwright and Zelda Williams and announced the DVD release of the film.

In 2010, Bowser directed his first solo feature film Jimmy Tupper Vs. The Goatman of Bowie. The film was a "found footage" style horror film that followed a young man's perceived encounter with the titular cryptid and his ensuing quest to track and capture the beast. Based around the urban legend from Bowser's home town, the film premiered at the 2010 South By Southwest film festival.

His film Worm is the first feature to be shot solely using a GoPro camera. Worm premiered at SIFF 2013  and won the special jury prize at DeadCENTER 2013.

As of 2014, Bowser co-hosts the Nerdist Industries podcast Bizarre States alongside Nerdist News's host Jessica Chobot.

In 2021, Bowser successfully raised $610,467 to make the feature film Onyx the Fortuituous and the Talisman of Souls, which is scheduled to premiere at the 2023 Sundance Film Festival.

Filmography

References

External links 

 
 

American male screenwriters
American music video directors
American television directors
American television writers
Living people
People from Bowie, Maryland
Film directors from Maryland
American male television writers
Screenwriters from Maryland
Year of birth missing (living people)